August 17 - Eastern Orthodox liturgical calendar - August 19

All fixed commemorations below are observed on August 31 by Eastern Orthodox Churches on the Old Calendar.

For August 18, Orthodox Churches on the Old Calendar commemorate the Saints listed on August 5.

Feasts

 Afterfeast of the Dormition.

Saints

 Martyrs Florus and Laurus of Illyria, twin brothers who worked as stonemasons (2nd century)
 The Holy Host of Paupers (300 martyrs), brought together by Saints Florus and Laurus, who smashed the statues of the pagan gods and were martyred by fire.
 Martyrs Hermes, Serapion, Polyaenus of Rome (2nd century)
 Hieromartyr Emilian, Bishop of Trebia in Umbria, and lay martyrs Hilarion, Dionysius, Hermippus, and about 1,000 others, in Italy (c. 300)
 Venerable Barnabas and his nephew Sophronius, founders of Mount Mela Monastery (Panagia Soumela), near Trebizond (412)
 Venerable Christopher of Trebizond, Abbot of Mount Mela Monastery (Panagia Soumela) (668)
 Saints John (674) and George (683), Patriarchs of Constantinople.
 Martyr Juliana near Strobilos in Lycia.
 Martyr Leo, drowned off the coast of Myra in Lycia.
 The 4 Venerable Ascetics, reposed in peace.
 Saint Macarius, Abbot of the Pelekete monastery near Prusa, Bithynia (840)  (see also: April 1)
 Venerable John of Rila, founder and Abbot of Rila Monastery, Bulgaria (946)  (see also: October 19)

Pre-Schism Western saints

 Saint Agapitus of Palestrina, a fifteen-year-old who bravely confessed Christ and was martyred in Palestrina near Rome (c. 274)
 Martyrs John and Crispus, priests in Rome who devoted themselves to recovering and burying the bodies of the martyrs, for which they also suffered martyrdom.
 Saint Firminus of Metz, Greek or Italian by origin, he was Bishop of Metz in France for eight years, Confessor (496)
 Saint Daig Maccairill (Daig, Dagaeus, Daganus), disciple of St Finian, he founded a monastery at Inis Cain Dega (Inniskeen), and was both abbot and bishop (586)
 Saint Milo, a monk together with his father at Fontenelle Abbey in France, and later a hermit (c. 740)
 Saint Inan (Evan),a hermit in Ayrshire in Scotland, where churches are dedicated to him (9th century)

Post-Schism Orthodox saints

 Saint Christodoulus the Philosopher, called "the Ossetian," of Georgia (12th century)
 Venerable Sophronius of St. Anne's skete on Mount Athos (18th century)
 New Monk-martyr Demetrius the Vlach, of Samarina (Pindos), at Ioannina (1808)  (see also: August 17)

New martyrs and confessors

 New Hieromartyrs Archimandrite Augustine of Orans Monastery, and Archpriest Nicholas of Nizhni-Novgorod, and 15 people with them (1918)
 New Hieromartyr Gregory Bronnikov, Priest, and Martyr Eugene Dmitriev and Michael Eregodsky (1937)

Other commemorations

 Uncovering of the Relics of Venerable Arsenios the New of Paros (1877)
 Repose of Schemamonk Nicholas "the Turk," of Optina Skete (1893)

Icons

 Icon of the Mother of God the "Directress" ("Hodegetria") of Trebizond, also known as "Panagia Soumeliotissa".

Icon gallery

Notes

References

Sources
 August 18 / August 31. Orthodox Calendar (PRAVOSLAVIE.RU).
 August 31 / August 18. Holy Trinity Russian Orthodox Church (A parish of the Patriarchate of Moscow).
 August 18. OCA - The Lives of the Saints.
 The Autonomous Orthodox Metropolia of Western Europe and the Americas (ROCOR). St. Hilarion Calendar of Saints for the year of our Lord 2004. St. Hilarion Press (Austin, TX). p. 61.
 Menologion: The Eighteenth Day Day of the Month of August. Orthodoxy in China.
 August 18. Latin Saints of the Orthodox Patriarchate of Rome.
 The Roman Martyrology. Transl. by the Archbishop of Baltimore. Last Edition, According to the Copy Printed at Rome in 1914. Revised Edition, with the Imprimatur of His Eminence Cardinal Gibbons. Baltimore: John Murphy Company, 1916. pp. 247-248.
 Rev. Richard Stanton. A Menology of England and Wales, or, Brief Memorials of the Ancient British and English Saints Arranged According to the Calendar, Together with the Martyrs of the 16th and 17th Centuries. London: Burns & Oates, 1892. pp. 397-399.

 Greek Sources
 Great Synaxaristes:  18 ΑΥΓΟΥΣΤΟΥ. ΜΕΓΑΣ ΣΥΝΑΞΑΡΙΣΤΗΣ.
  Συναξαριστής. 18 Αυγούστου. ECCLESIA.GR. (H ΕΚΚΛΗΣΙΑ ΤΗΣ ΕΛΛΑΔΟΣ).

 Russian Sources
  31 августа (18 августа). Православная Энциклопедия под редакцией Патриарха Московского и всея Руси Кирилла (электронная версия). (Orthodox Encyclopedia - Pravenc.ru).

August in the Eastern Orthodox calendar